Long Lake Township is the name of some places in the U.S. state of Minnesota:
Long Lake Township, Crow Wing County, Minnesota
Long Lake Township, Watonwan County, Minnesota

Minnesota township disambiguation pages